Phoenix Park Racecourse is a former horse racing venue in Ireland. It was located in the townlands of Ashtown and Castleknock in the civil parish of Castleknock on the northern edge of the Phoenix Park in Dublin. The course was founded by JHH Peard, and racing began there in 1902.

History
From 1939 to 1950 the track was managed by Mr Peard's son Harry, and thereafter it was run by his widow Fanny. Mrs Peard retired in 1969, and the track closed for the first time at the end of the 1981 season.  The course re-opened for the 1983 season, owned by a consortium that included Vincent O'Brien and Robert Sangster. Due to financial difficulties the track was permanently closed for racing in late 1990.

Racing events
Several of Ireland's leading flat races, which later were contested at other venues, originally took place at Phoenix Park. These include the Irish Champion Stakes and the Phoenix Stakes. Other races of note held at Phoenix Park include the G III Vauxhall Trial Stakes.

Other events
On 14 August 1983, U2 played to 15,000 people at a nine-hour concert at the racecourse as part of the band's War Tour international concert tour. The supporting acts were Perfect Crime, Steel Pulse, Big Country, Eurythmics and Simple Minds. fans went on to sing "40", over half hour after the band left the stage.

Further reading

References

External links
 Race Courses of Great Britain and Ireland - Phoenix Stakes Thoroughbred Heritage
 Map of Phoenix Park Club Racecourse Ordnance Survey Ireland
 Phoenix Park races in 1921 Pathé News 
 Phoenix Park races in 1921 Pathé News
 Irish Champion Stakes in 1986

Former horse racing venues in the Republic of Ireland
Sports venues in Fingal
Sports venues completed in 1902
1902 establishments in Ireland
Phoenix Park
1990 disestablishments in Ireland